Events from the year 1987 in North Korea.

Incumbents
Premier: Li Gun-mo 
Supreme Leader: Kim Il-sung

Events

 9 February - Choe Kum-chol.
 Mid 1987- Construction begun on the Ryugyong Hotel. The hotel was an intention to be the world's tallest hotel, and was supposed to be opened in 1989 for the 1989 World Festival of Youth  and Students
 17 August - Ri Kwang-hyok.
 24 August - Ri Jun-il.
 24 September - Pak Song-chol.
 10 October - Kim Kum-il.
29 November - Bombing of Korean Air Flight 858
 11 December - Han Song-hyok.

References

 
North Korea
1980s in North Korea
Years of the 20th century in North Korea
North Korea